Joseph Wagner may refer to:

 Joseph Wagner (New York politician) (1853–1932), New York politician
 Joseph Wagner (engraver) (1706–1780), German engraver
 Joseph Wagner (Massachusetts politician) (born 1960), Massachusetts politician 
 Joseph Wagner (Wisconsin politician) (1809–1896), Wisconsin politician
 Joe Wagner (Joseph Bernard Wagner, 1889–1948), American baseball player

See also
 Josef Wagner (disambiguation)